Matthew David Benson, better known by his stage name Matt B, is a Grammy-nominated American singer, songwriter, musician, and record producer whose genres have been generally classified as R&B, Hip hop, and Afrobeats.  His album, Eden, debuted in the Top 40 on Billboard's R&B albums chart.

In 2022, Benson's, Gimme Love (Matt B featuring Eddy Kenzo), was nominated for a Grammy Award for Best Global Music Performance and charted at #36 on Billboard's US Afrobeats Songs chart.

Early life
Matthew David Benson was born in Oak Park, Illinois and is one of seven siblings.  He began singing in the church choir and church events when he was a young child. Benson was inspired to become a singer by his grandmother.  In 2005, Benson and his brothers formed a singing trio, TriEnd (pronounced trend). TriEnd dissolved in 2008 and Matt B began his solo career in 2009.

"My family had been singing for a very long time, as long as I can remember, said Benson. My grandmother was born in 1919 so she was born in an era where it wasn’t safe for black people to travel nationally or even internationally and they had to watch where they went. The fact that my grandmother was able to be a part of something like that back in the 1940s and travel all across the United States singing was inspirational to me and just amazing.

Music
Matt B is a singer, songwriter, musician, and record producer.  He has cited his influences as Stevie Wonder, Boyz II Men, Usher, and The Temptations.  He began his solo career in 2009 and has released six studio albums.  In 2019, Benson performed at the Magnificent Mile Lights Festival, which was nationally televised. In 2022, he was nominated for a Grammy Award for his single, Gimme Love, which features Eddy Kenzo.

Love and War was released and distributed by Tokyo-based, StarBase Records in 2014. The album charted at #1 on iTunes R&B Chart as well as the lead single, Plain Girl, charting at #1 in Japan. The album was a compilation of songs that were previously released, and was well received in Japan.

Dive, Benson's self-produced sophomore album was released in 2016.  The album charted at #1 on iTunes R&B Chart in Japan.

Benson teamed up with producer, Bryan-Michael Cox and recorded the EP, RISE, which was distributed by Priority Records in 2018.  His single, Losing You, earned him Best R&B Male Artist at the Indie Music Channel Awards.

In 2021, Benson released his US debut album, Eden, produced by Bryan-Michael Cox and Tricky Stewart, which received favorable reviews and charted on Billboard's Top 40 R&B Albums. The album's single, Deep received favorable reviews.

 Gimme Love
In 2021, Benson teamed up with Ugandan recording artist Eddy Kenzo and co-wrote and recorded, Gimme Love.  In 2022, the single was nominated for a Grammy Award for Best Global Performance as well as charting at #36 on Billboard's US Afrobeats Songs chart.  The single's music video won numerous awards at film festivals including winning Best Song at the New York International Film Festival as well as his wife and manager, Angela Valarie Benson winning an award for the single's music video, which she directed.   Benson and Kenzo performed, Gimme Love at the Eddy Kenzo Festival at Kololo Airstrip in Uganda to an audience of over 100,000, including Uganda's Prime Minister Robinah Nabbanja.

Awards
{|class="wikitable sortable"
!Year
!Nominated Work
!Category
!Award
!Result
|-
| 2022 || Gimme Love  || Best Global Music Performance || Grammy Award||
|-
| 2022 || Losing You || Best Male R&B Artist|| Indie Music Channel Award|| 
|-
| 2022 || Gimme Love || Best Special Video || Indie Music Channel Award || 
|-
| 2022 || Gimme Love || Best Song || Oniros Film Awards || 
|-
| 2022 || Gimme Love || Best Song || New York International Film Award || 
|-
| 2022 || Gimme Love||Best Male Vocal, Male Artist, Music Video, Best Song, Best Rhythm & Blues|| LIT Talent Award||  
|-

Discography

2011 - Matt B:301B
2014 - Love & War
2016 -Dive
2018 - RISE 
2019 - Homecoming
2021 - Eden

References

1989 births
African-American male singer-songwriters
American hip hop singers
Living people
Singer-songwriters from Illinois
American contemporary R&B singers
21st-century African-American male singers